Akrochordite is a rare hydrated arsenate mineral with the chemical formula  and represents a small group of rare manganese (Mn) arsenates and, similarly to most other Mn-bearing arsenates, possess pinkish colour. It is typically associated with metamorphic Mn deposits.

References

Arsenate minerals
Manganese minerals
Monoclinic minerals
Minerals in space group 14